The 2019 National Women's League was the seventeenth season of the NWL, New Zealand's top level women's football league since its establishment in 2002. Seven teams were involved in this season representing the different regions in New Zealand. This was the second year that the league played two rounds, with the two highest-placed sides progressing to a one-off grand final. The season also featured a double header round over Labour weekend, in which all sides except Central played two matches over the weekend.

Teams

Regular season

League table

*Round 13 match between WaiBOP and Northern Lights was abandoned at half-time with the score 0-0 
**Round 13 match between Central and Capital was postponed due to inclement weather and road closures. Was not played and declared a 0–0 draw

Positions by round

Fixtures and results
New Zealand women's football league matches took place from September to December 2019 and for the second year running, included a double header round over the Labour weekend.

Round 1

Bye: Northern Lights

Round 2

Bye: Auckland

Round 3

Bye: Canterbury United

Round 4

Bye: Capital

Round 5

Bye: Southern United

Round 6 

Bye: WaiBOP

Round 7 (Double Header Week)

Bye: Central

Round 8

Bye: Northern Lights

Round 9

Bye: Auckland

Round 10

Bye: Canterbury United

Round 11

Bye: Capital

Round 12

Bye: WaiBOP

Round 13

Bye: Southern United 
*Match abandoned at half-time with the score 0-0 
**Postponed due to inclement weather and road closures. Not going to be played so declared a 0–0 draw

Final

Statistics

Top scorers

Hat-tricks

References

External links
Official website 

2018
football
Women
Women
New Zealand, Women